Gohl is a surname. Notable people with this surname include:

 Andreas Gohl (born 1994), Austrian freestyle skier
 Billy Gohl (1873–1927), German-American serial killer
 Christiane Gohl (born 1958), German author
 Christopher Gohl (born 1974), German politician
 Jakob Gohl, also known as Jacobus Golius
 Janey Gohl (born 1956), American beauty queen
 Matthias Gohl, Swiss music producer

See also
 Geul river
 Göhl, Germany